Esk Bridge railway station served the settlement of Esk Bridge, Midlothian, Scotland from 1874 to 1930 on the Penicuik Railway.

History 
The station opened on 1 July 1874 by the Penicuik Railway. The station was situated south of Harpers Brae. The station was originally called Esk Bridge, but it was later changed to Eskbridge. There were no goods facilities and no sidings served Esk Mills. During the First World War the station closed on 1 January 1917 as a wartime economy measure but reopened on 2 June 1919, before closing permanently on 22 September 1930.

References

External links 

Disused railway stations in Midlothian
Former North British Railway stations
Railway stations in Great Britain opened in 1874
Railway stations in Great Britain closed in 1917
Railway stations in Great Britain opened in 1919
Railway stations in Great Britain closed in 1930
1874 establishments in Scotland
1930 disestablishments in Scotland
Penicuik